Anne-Marie McEwen is a Trinidadian former cricketer who played as a right-arm medium bowler and right-handed batter. She appeared in four One Day Internationals for the West Indies, all at the 1997 World Cup. She played domestic cricket for Trinidad and Tobago.

References

External links
 
 

Living people
West Indian women cricketers
West Indies women One Day International cricketers
Trinidad and Tobago women cricketers
Year of birth missing (living people)
Date of birth missing (living people)